Ann Scott (born 3 November 1965) is a French novelist. She is regarded as a social realist for her novels which paint portraits of contemporary youth and her second novel Superstars has given her a cult status in France.

Biography
She was born and raised in Paris, France. Her mother is a photographer of Russian descent, and her father, a French businessman and art collector.

During the mid eighties, at age 17, she left home and moved to London, England, where she became a musician, playing drums with local rock bands. She then later turned to fashion modelling for two years and was one of the first tattooed fashion model to break through in prêt-à-porter and couture in the eighties. Then at 21, on her return to Paris, she started writing fiction.

She is now the author of eight novels including Superstars which has become a cult novel translated in several countries. She also co-wrote Paradize for French band Indochine for their album of the same title which sold over a million copies in France.

Her penultimate novel Cortex depicts a domestic terrorist attack at the Academy Awards ceremony in Los Angeles and parts ways with her previous themes.

Her latest novel, La Grâce et les ténèbres (Grace and Darkness), highlights cyber-surveillance and the fight against jihadist propaganda on social networks alongside a group of French citizens named the Katiba des Narvalos.

Personal life
She has been romantically involved with several rock musicians and is also known to have had bisexual affairs. She dated French deejay Sextoy for three years, to whom she paid tribute after her death in her third book.

Before she became published, she shared a flat in Paris with French writer Virginie Despentes. She was close friends to Daul Kim and Lee Alexander McQueen and paid them tribute in the French magazine Libération.

Controversy
She was strongly rejected by a part of the French gay and lesbian community after declaring on the set of French TV show Nulle Part Ailleurs that she found homosexuality "immature": "Being bisexual has often brought some kind of balance to my life, but having strict homosexual relationships led to pathological experiences for me".

Bibliography

References

External links 

 Official Ann Scott website

1965 births
Living people
Writers from Paris
French people of Russian descent
Bisexual women
Bisexual novelists
French women novelists
Postmodern writers
French women short story writers
French short story writers
French LGBT novelists
21st-century French LGBT people